A prismatic surface is a surface generated by all the lines that are parallel to a given line and intersect a broken line that is not in the same plane as the given line. The broken line is the directrix of the surface; the parallel lines are its generators (or elements). If the broken line is closed (i.e., a closed polygon), then the surface is a closed prismatic surface.

With regards to crystallography, a prismatic surface is a single face of a prismatic form, which is an open form consisting of three, four, or six identical faces related by a symmetry operator.

See also
Prism

References

Surfaces
Crystallography